Hrvoje Braović (born 7 August 1956) is a Croatian football manager.

Clubs
GNK Dinamo Zagreb (1998, 2000–01)
FC Lyn Oslo (2002)
NK Kamen Ingrad (2004–05)
Videoton FC, Assistant Coach (2006-07)
HAŠK Zagreb (2011)
Segesta Sisak (2012)

References

External links
 
Socersway

1956 births
Living people
Croatian football managers
GNK Dinamo Zagreb managers
Lyn Fotball managers
NK Kamen Ingrad managers
HNK Segesta managers
Croatian expatriate football managers
Expatriate football managers in Norway
Croatian expatriate sportspeople in Norway
Croatian expatriate sportspeople in Hungary